Brenton Vilcins (born 15 May 1966) is  a former Australian rules footballer who played with Footscray in the Victorian Football League (VFL).	

When Vilcins was captain-coach of Leeton Football Club in 1990 and playing for the Riverina Football League in the 1990 Victorian Country Football Championships, he kicked sevenngoals in the grand final against the North Central Football League at Donald.

Vilcins won Cobram Football Club's 1992 best and fairest award.

Notes

External links 
		

Living people
1966 births
Australian rules footballers from Victoria (Australia)
Western Bulldogs players
Werribee Football Club players